Eido II (also noted as Aico, Ido, Egidius, Aigo, Eiko or Heiko; died 1045 or 1046), was Bishop of Meissen from 1040 to 1045 or 1046.

Bishop Eido II is documented solely in the context of a gift by Emperor Henry III to the bishopric of Meissen, at the instigation and on the recommendation of Humfrid, Archbishop of Magdeburg, and Margrave Ekkehard I of Meissen; Eido is supposed to have been a friend of Ekkehard.

Eido's death, according to Machatschek, occurred either in the last part of 1045 or in the first half of 1046.

References

Roman Catholic bishops of Meissen
1046 deaths
Year of birth unknown